Purav Raja and Divij Sharan were the defending champions but chose not to defend their title.

Marcus Daniell and Aisam-ul-Haq Qureshi won the title after defeating Treat Huey and Denis Kudla 6–3, 7–6(7–0) in the final.

Seeds

Draw

External Links
 Main Draw

Aegon Surbiton Trophy - Men's Doubles
2017 Men's Doubles
Aegon Surbiton Trophy